Domenico Vicini (1 September 1971) is a tennis player from San Marino.

Best known for his appearances record in Davis Cup with his national team (100 ties played), he was rewarded in 2012 with the Commitment Award by ITF.

He represents San Marino also in Games of the Small States of Europe, where he won 4 silver and 3 bronze medals, six of them in doubles, with Christian Rosti (1997,2003), Gabriel Francini (1999) and Stefano Galvani (2007,2009,2011).

Currently, he plays on seniors circuit. He was the first San Marino male player to enter in ATP ranking, reaching the 652nd position in doubles ranking in 2008.

References

External links 
 
 

1971 births
Living people
Sammarinese male tennis players